Henry VIII and His Six Wives is a 1972 British historical film adaptation, directed by Waris Hussein, of the BBC 1970 six-part miniseries The Six Wives of Henry VIII. Keith Michell, who plays Henry VIII in the TV series, also portrays the king in the film. His six wives are portrayed by different actresses, among them Frances Cuka as Catherine of Aragon, and Jane Asher as Jane Seymour. Donald Pleasence portrays Thomas Cromwell and Bernard Hepton portrays Archbishop Thomas Cranmer, a role he had also played in the miniseries and briefly in its follow-up Elizabeth R.

Plot
On his deathbed, Henry VIII reflects upon his long reign, and especially the crucial part his six marriages have played. The bulk of the film is depicted in flashback, while the dying Henry is surrounded by his family and courtiers.

Henry's first queen is the Spanish princess Catherine of Aragon. The young pair are in the midst of celebrating the birth of their son, only to be told that he has died. Henry and Catherine mourn their child together, and hope for another soon. Many years pass, during which time Catherine only produces one living daughter, Mary. Henry confides to Thomas More that he fears the marriage is cursed by God, as Catherine was previously wed to Henry's late older brother, Arthur, although Catherine proclaimed the marriage was not consummated.

Henry woos Anne Boleyn, a lady at court, who refuses to sleep with him unless she is his wife. Henry presses the Vatican to annul his marriage to Catherine. When that fails, he has Cardinal Wolsey removed from office and himself made head of the new Church of England. The marriage annulled, Catherine is sent away from court, and Anne is crowned the new queen. Anne also fails to produce a male heir, giving birth to a daughter, Elizabeth. Henry loses interest in Anne and starts courting Jane Seymour, another lady of the court. Thomas Cromwell, protégé of Cardinal Wolsey, observes Henry's interest in Jane and assists him by presenting a false case of Anne's infidelity with various men of the court, including her own brother, George Boleyn. Anne is beheaded in the Tower of London.

Henry marries Jane Seymour, who successfully returns Princess Mary to royal favour and has opinions on the matter of religion, asking for pardons for the participants of the Pilgrimage of Grace. Jane gives birth to Henry's long-sought male heir, Edward, but she dies soon after.

Henry's courtiers advise him to marry again for diplomatic reasons, with Cromwell pushing for the German Anne of Cleves, of whose portrait Henry approves. However, when she arrives Henry is disappointed that her appearance does not match the image. After a reluctant wedding, he arranges an annulment.

At court, Henry is drawn to Catherine Howard, young cousin of Anne Boleyn. Catherine is flattered by Henry's attention. Her uncle, Thomas Howard, Duke of Norfolk, urges her to return his affections. Henry and Catherine marry, with Henry lavishing her with many gifts and jewels. Archbishop Thomas Cranmer discovers that Catherine has had liaisons before her marriage, and presents this knowledge to Henry, who initially disbelieves the charges. Cranmer secures a confession from Catherine, who also admits an affair with Thomas Culpeper during her marriage to Henry. Catherine is beheaded.

Henry, now elderly, approaches Catherine Parr, a widow from two previous marriages. Catherine is reluctant, citing her religious views which differ from Henry's, but Henry admits his need for companionship in his old age. The pair marry, and Catherine becomes a loving stepmother to the royal children Mary, Elizabeth, and Edward.

At the end of the flashbacks, Catherine Parr is shown waiting by Henry's beside with Princess Mary. Archbishop Cranmer is summoned for Henry's final confession, and Henry dies holding his hand.

Main cast
Keith Michell as Henry VIII
 Frances Cuka as Catherine of Aragon
Charlotte Rampling as Anne Boleyn
Jane Asher as Jane Seymour 
Jenny Bos as Anne of Cleves
Lynne Frederick as Catherine Howard
Barbara Leigh-Hunt as Catherine Parr
Donald Pleasence as Thomas Cromwell
Brian Blessed as the Duke of Suffolk 
Bernard Hepton as Thomas Cranmer
Michael Gough as the Duke of Norfolk
Michael Goodliffe as Sir Thomas More
John Bryans as Cardinal Wolsey

Production
After the success of Keith Michell's performance in the original BBC series, which focused on the individual wives, it was decided to make a feature film from Henry VIII's point of view.  Nat Cohen asked Mark Shivas to produce the film.

Locations
 Hatfield House Old Palace, Park & River Lea flowing through the park, Hatfield, Hertfordshire, England, UK  used in  scenes featuring Anne Boleyn & Catherine Howard
 Woburn Abbey, Woburn, Bedfordshire, England, UK
 Allington Castle, Maidstone, Kent, England, UK used in scenes featuring Anne Boleyn
 Eton College, Eton, Berkshire, England, UK  used as Hampton Court and as Tower Green in execution scenes
 EMI-MGM Elstree Studios, Borehamwood, Hertfordshire, England, UK

Notes

External links 
 

1972 films
1970s biographical films
1970s historical films
British biographical films
British historical films
Films set in Tudor England
Films directed by Waris Hussein
Films about Henry VIII
Films set in castles
Cultural depictions of the wives of Henry VIII
EMI Films films
1970s English-language films
1970s British films